The 1998 Texas Tech Red Raiders football team represented Texas Tech University as a member of the Big 12 Conference during the 1998 NCAA Division I-A football season. In their 12th season under head coach Spike Dykes, the Red Raiders compiled a 7–5 record (4–4 against Big 12 opponents), finished in third place in Southern Division of the Big 12, and outscored opponents by a combined total of 315 to 215. The team played its home games at Clifford B. and Audrey Jones Stadium in Lubbock, Texas.

Schedule

References

Texas Tech
Texas Tech Red Raiders football seasons
Texas Tech Red Raiders football